The 2007 Nigerian Senate election in Federal Capital Territory was held on 21 April 2007, to elect a member of the Nigerian Senate to represent Federal Capital Territory. Usman Jibrin Wowo representing FCT Senatorial District won on the platform of the All Nigeria Peoples Party.

Overview

Summary

Results

FCT Senatorial District 
The election was won by Usman Jibrin Wowo of the All Nigeria Peoples Party.

References 

April 2007 events in Nigeria
Federal Capital Territory Senate elections
Fed